The 1975–76 All-Ireland Senior Club Football Championship was the sixth staging of the All-Ireland Senior Club Football Championship since its establishment by the Gaelic Athletic Association in 1970-71.

University College Dublin were the defending champions, however, they failed to qualify after conceding a walkover to St. Vincent's in the Dublin County Championship.

On 14 March 1976, St. Vincent's won the championship following a 4-10 to 0-05 defeat of Roscommon Gaels in the All-Ireland final at O'Moore Park. It was their first ever championship title.

Results

Munster Senior Club Football Championship

First round

Semi-finals

Finals

All-Ireland Senior Club Football Championship

Quarter-final

Semi-finals

Final

Championship statistics

Miscellaneous

 St. Joseph's won the Ulster Club Championship for the first time in their history. They were also the first team from Donegal to win the provincial title.
 Roscommon Gaels became the first team to win back-to-back Connacht Club Championship titles.
 Nemo Rangers became the first team to win back-to-back Munster Club Championship titles.

References

1975 in Gaelic football
1976 in Gaelic football